Rock Creek is an unincorporated community in Twin Falls County, Idaho, United States, roughly  southeast of Twin Falls. Rock Creek had a post office 1871–1975.

Rock Creek is part of the Twin Falls, Idaho Metropolitan Statistical Area.

See also

References

Unincorporated communities in Idaho
Unincorporated communities in Twin Falls County, Idaho